Euryops acraeus, the mountain euryops, is a species of flowering plant in the daisy family Asteraceae, native to the Drakensberg Mountains of South Africa.

The Latin specific epithet acraeus means "dwelling on high ground". Reflecting its rocky mountainous habitat, in cultivation this plant requires full sun and very sharp drainage, preferably in an alpine garden. It has gained the Royal Horticultural Society's Award of Garden Merit.

References

acraeus
Flora of South Africa